Eduardo Halfon (born 1971) is a Guatemalan writer.

Career
Eduardo Halfon was born in Guatemala City, moved to the United States at the age of ten, went to school in South Florida, studied industrial engineering at North Carolina State University, and then returned to Guatemala to teach literature for eight years at Universidad Francisco Marroquín. Named one of the best young Latin American writers by the Hay Festival of Bogotá, he is also the recipient of a Guggenheim Fellowship, Roger Caillois Prize, José María de Pereda Prize for the Short Novel, and Guatemalan National Prize in Literature. He is the author of fourteen books published in Spanish and three novels published in English: Mourning, winner of the Edward Lewis Wallant Award and the International Latino Book Award, finalist for the Kirkus Prize and Balcones Fiction Prize, and long listed for the PEN Translation Prize; Monastery, long-listed for the Best Translated Book Award; and The Polish Boxer, a New York Times Editors’ Choice selection and finalist for the International Latino Book Award. Halfon is currently living in Paris and holds a fellowship from Columbia University.

Published works
Esto no es una pipa, Saturno (Alfaguara 2003, Punto de Lectura 2007)
De cabo roto (Littera Books 2003)
El ángel literario (Anagrama 2004, Semifinalist of the Herralde Prize for Novel)
Siete minutos de desasosiego (Panamericana Editorial 2007)
Clases de hebreo (AMG 2008)
Clases de dibujo (AMG 2009, XV Café Bretón y Bodegas Olarra Literary Prize)
El boxeador polaco (Pre-Textos 2008)
La pirueta (Pre-Textos 2010, XIV José María de Pereda Prize for Short Novel)
Mañana nunca lo hablamos (Pre-Textos 2011)
Elocuencias de un tartamudo (Pre-Textos 2012)
Monasterio (Libros del Asteroide 2012)
Signor Hoffman (Libros del Asteroide 2015)
Duelo (Libros del Asteroide 2017)
Biblioteca bizarra (Jekyll & Jill 2018)
Canción (Libros del Asteroide 2021)

Works Translated into English
The Polish Boxer (Bellevue Literary Press, Pushkin Press, 2012)
Monastery (Bellevue Literary Press, 2014)
Mourning (Bellevue Literary Press, 2018)

Awards
 2007: Named one of the 39 best young Latin American writers by the Hay Festival of Bogotá
 2010: José María de Pereda Prize for the Short Novel, for The Pirouette (Spain)
 2011: Guggenheim Fellowship
 2015: Prix Roger Caillois (France)
 2018: National Prize in Literature (Guatemala)
 2018: Prix du Meilleur Livre Étranger, for Mourning (France)
 2018: Premio de las Librerías de Navarra, for Mourning (Spain)
 2019: Edward Lewis Wallant Award, for Mourning (U.S.)
 2019: International Latino Book Award, for Mourning (U.S.)
 2021: Premio Cálamo, for Canción (Spain)

References

External links

What Can't Be Forgotten, The New York Review of Books
"The Polish Boxer" (story), Words Without Borders
Snapshot of Guatemala, Granta
Roundtable Discussion on Language, The Believer
Interview at PrensaLibre.com (in Spanish)
Eduardo Halfon’s Year, Sampsonia Way, August 9, 2012
Review of The Polish Boxer, NY Times Book Review, December 14, 2012
Review of The Polish Boxer, LA Times, September 30, 2012
Audio Interview, NPR, May 10, 2013
Better not say too much: Eduardo Halfon on literature, paranoia and leaving Guatemala, The Guardian, November 5, 2015

1971 births
Living people
Guatemalan male writers
Prix Roger Caillois recipients
People from Guatemala City
North Carolina State University alumni